is a song by Japanese city pop singer Mariya Takeuchi, featured on her 1984 album Variety. Upon its release as a single a year later, it was moderately successful, selling around 10,000 copies.

In 2017, "Plastic Love" saw a resurgence internationally when an eight-minute remix of the song was uploaded to YouTube. It quickly garnered more than 24 million views, before a copyright claim over the album art unintentionally led to its removal. It was subsequently restored in 2019 and has garnered over 63 million views.

Production and release 
"Plastic Love" was written and performed by Takeuchi and produced by her husband, Tatsuro Yamashita. In an interview with The Japan Times, Takeuchi remarked: "I wanted to write something danceable, something with a city pop sound... [the lyrics] tell the story of a woman who lost the man she truly loves." Yamashita also played guitar for the song, while Yasuharu Nakanishi played electric piano, Kōki Itō played bass guitar, and Jūn Aoyama played drums.

The song was first released on Takeuchi's number-one hit album, Variety (1984). The single was Takeuchi's twelfth single to be released. A twelve-inch single was released on March 25, 1985, which included an "extended club mix" and "new re-mix" of the song and reached 86th on the Oricon Singles Chart.

Resurgence 
On July 5, 2017, an eight-minute fan-made remix of "Plastic Love" was uploaded to YouTube by a user known as "Plastic Lover". The video showed a cropped version of the cover of Takeuchi's earlier single "Sweetest Music", taken by Los Angeles-based photographer Alan Levenson. In an interview, Plastic Lover said that their video was a re-upload of a now-deleted video on YouTube.

Coinciding with the vaporwave genre's rise in popularity, Plastic Lover's upload spread rapidly throughout YouTube through the platform's recommendations algorithm. Its spread was also aided by internet memes, discussions on Reddit, and fan art of the "Sweetest Music" cover on platforms such as DeviantArt. The video garnered 24 million views before being taken down for a copyright dispute with Levenson, but was then restored in 2019 with credit given to Levenson in the video description and thumbnail. The song has also inspired a fan-made English translation version, in addition to inspiring remixes and fan art of the cover. As of May 2021, the video had more than 63 million views.

Ryan Bassil of Vice noted that the song is "a rare tune that doesn't exactly need words to expertly describe a specific, defined feeling – one of lust, heartbreak, love, fear, adventure, loss, all caught up in the swirling midst of a night out on the town" and called the song "the best pop song in the world". Cat Zhang of Pitchfork reported that younger city pop fans commonly cite "Plastic Love" as their "gateway to the genre". Multiple cover versions of "Plastic Love" also exist, including by Tofubeats, Friday Night Plans and Chai.

On May 16, 2019, the short version of the official music video produced by Kyōtaro Hayashi was released on YouTube running 90 seconds long. The full version, which runs approximately 5 minutes, is included in the DVD and Blu-ray release of "Souvenir the Movie" released on November 18, 2020. The music video became available on YouTube on November 11, 2021. Tower Records released a re-print of "Plastic Love" as a 12-inch single on November 3, 2021, along with LP records of Takeuchi's albums Variety and Request.

Track listing 
All tracks are written by Mariya Takeuchi and arranged by Tatsuro Yamashita.

12" single
 "Plastic Love" (Extended Club Mix) – 9:15
 "Plastic Love" (New Re-Mix) – 4:51

Charts

See also 
 "Mayonaka no Door", a city pop song that saw a resurgence in 2020

References

External links 
 
 
 

1984 songs
1985 singles
J-pop songs
Japanese-language songs
Mariya Takeuchi songs
Warner Music Japan singles
Songs about heartache
Internet memes introduced in 2017
Viral videos